Sounds from the Marr-Ket Place is an album by organist Hank Marr which was released by the King label in 1968.

Reception

The AllMusic review by Wilson McCloy stated  the album "is a solid soul-jazz outing with tight, funky arrangements and several blues. James Blood Ulmer makes his recording debut here".

Track listing
 "The Marr-Ket Place" – 2:29
 "Soup Spoon" – 2:50
 "Smothered Soul" – 5:00
 "I Remember Acapulco" – 3:00
 "Greens A-Go-Go" – 2:48
 "Down in the Bottom" (Marr, Gene Redd) – 2:57
 "My Dream Just Passed" – 3:07
 "Home Fries" – 2:47
 "Come and Get It" – 4:10
 "Get On Down" – 3:20

Personnel
Hank Marr – Hammond organ
George Adams – tenor saxophone
James Blood Ulmer – guitar
Other unidentified musicians

References

King Records (United States) albums
Hank Marr albums
1968 albums